Solent Blue Line Limited, primarily trading under the name Bluestar, is a bus operator providing services in Southampton and surrounding areas of Hampshire. It is a subsidiary of the Go South Coast sector of the Go-Ahead Group.

History

Solent Blue Line was formed by Southern Vectis in May 1987 to compete with Southampton Citybus on some of its major routes with some Bristol VRTs.

In October 1987 Solent Blue Line purchased the Hants & Sussex business from Basil Williams and the Eastleigh and Southampton routes which had previously been part of Hants & Dorset, from Stagecoach in Hampshire. This expanded the fleet from 16 to 115 buses. New buses began to be purchased with Leyland Olympians for the Southampton to Winchester service and minibuses for the Eastleigh to Winchester service. Some services were operated under franchise by Brijan Tours and Marchwood Motorways.

From here the network expanded until in 2003 the network underwent a change, involving a new name and the launch of the Bluestar brand soon after, as a name for their premier services with Bluestar services one and two launching in 2004, the three and four service launching a year later and the Waterside services eight and nine having fully launched by 2006.

In July 2005 Solent Blue Line was included in the sale of Southern Vectis to the Go-Ahead Group and subsequently the head office functions of the company were consolidated with those of the other Go South Coast companies, Southern Vectis and Wilts & Dorset, in Poole. In October 2006, Solent Blue Line purchased Marchwood Motorways

After the withdrawal of the Red Rocket brand on 25 February 2008, most of the company's services began to run under the Bluestar brand. The fleet has recently undergone several updates, including the introduction of a smartcard system called the key, the introduction of free Wi-Fi internet to all buses, and USB charging points. In June 2017, all Bluestar and Unilink buses accept contactless payment, as part of a £1.6m investment from Hampshire County Council.

Bluestar has also been one of the test sites for new air filter technology which removes and captures particulates from the atmosphere. A test has been done in September 2018 for 100 days and has claimed to have cleaned 3.2 million cubic metres. It is planned that these will be fitted onto buses nationwide on Go Ahead's buses. To accompany this, they have also installed solar panels onto the roof of the test bus to see if the filter can be made to run on its own power. 16 more buses have been installed with solar panels to reduce maintenance costs and fuel consumption. There are 6 buses with the air filter, including the original with the prototype air filter installed on ADL Enviro200 MMC types, wearing the Bluestar "breathe" branding.

In November 2022, First Hampshire & Dorset announced the intention to withdraw their Southampton-based operations. This took place on 19 February 2023 with the addition of six more routes to its network, with Bluestar gaining a monopoly over Southampton servicing the areas where the former company operated, similar to the event in Bournemouth where parent company Go South Coast under morebus took over the majority of the services ran by its competitor, Yellow Buses in August 2022 when the latter went into administration. 

As a result, they have had 14 Wright Eclipse Geminis from Go North East, 4 Alexander Dennis Enviro400s from morebus, 3 Scania OmniCities from both Damory and Southern Vectis and 8 Optare Versas Swindon’s Bus Company.

Services
The company itself holds the original name of Solent Blue Line, however none of the buses it operates currently use this branding, the last few buses using this branding was incorporated into the Bluestar network in 2008. As a result, a number of sub brands are used for the company's bus services.

Bluestar

The Bluestar service was originally launched in 2004 running the main routes with destinations outside of Southampton. However, since 2008 the service has become the main brand for the company with the vast majority of the bus routes running under it. Most of these services terminate in or pass through Southampton City Centre, with the exception of school/college contract services which may start in the suburbs of the city or may not reach the city limits, and services 5 (Boyatt Wood to Romsey via Eastleigh), 35 (Romsey to Braishfield/Halterworth), 36, (Lockerley to Romsey) and 39 (Nomansland to Romsey) thus not going near the city centre.

QuayConnect

The QuayConnect shuttle service runs a service around the city of Southampton, stopping at Southampton Central railway station, Westquay Shopping Centre and Town Quay, for the Hythe Ferry and the Red Funnel ferries to the Isle of Wight. The service was started as City-Link, under the previous operator, Enterprise, but the operation was taken over by Bluestar on 28 September 2008. The first two buses used on the service were Dennis Darts inherited from Enterprise, and were repainted in a new two-tone blue livery with the interiors re branded. In May 2016 the service was re-branded as QuayConnect with a new red and white livery featuring the newest Red Jet which came into service for Red Funnel shortly after. Originally the service was free to use for all passengers, but a change in May 2014 saw fares introduced for all except Red Funnel ticket holders. The frequency of the service was also cut down to every 30 minutes, but with a duplicate bus running on some morning services and a 15-minute frequency between 4-7pm, or when local events take place in Southampton or the Isle of Wight, such as Cowes Week or Bestival. The service was upgraded with an Alexander Dennis Enviro400 City in November 2018.

Unilink

The Unilink service is run under contract by Bluestar, on behalf of the University of Southampton. The contract was extended for a further ten years in December 2017 and the company ordered 32 new buses for the Unilink fleet.

New Forest Tour

The New Forest Tour is a circular open-top bus service running around the New Forest, between Lyndhurst, Brockenhurst, Lymington, Beaulieu and Exbury.

It commenced in 2004, using distinctively branded yellow and orange Bristol VRs (in the same livery as the old Southern Vectis open-top services). The service was reversed in 2005, to run in the opposite direction. For the 2006 season, two low-floor East Lancs Myllennium bodied Volvo B7TLs from Wilts & Dorset were used, retaining the Wilts & Dorset livery but with "New Forest Tour" vinyls added. In 2007 the buses passed to Solent Blue Line and were repainted in a new green and orange livery, with ponies on the side. Again, this is similar to the Southern Vectis livery which that company uses on their open-top buses.

Former Services

Nightstar
The Nightstar services used to run on Friday and Saturday nights and were aimed at people who had a night out in Southampton. The service commenced alongside the new bluestar services and ran from 00:45 until 03:45. All services began at Leisure World, Southampton and made their way past other large clubs before completing its route. These routes generally followed those of their daytime number counterparts with additional stops to take into account destinations served by other routes. In February 2014, all but the Unilink U1N ceased to run due to council funding cuts.

Baby Bluestar

Between 2008 and 2010, Bluestar used Baby Bluestar branding for their local services. There have been twelve Baby Bluestar services, of which the H1, H2, T3 and T4 all still run, albeit under the Bluestar name. Five of the other services have since been dropped and reverted to the normal Bluestar services.

Red Rocket

Red Rocket was launched on 3 September 2006 as a high frequency network centred on Eastleigh, extending to Winchester in the north and Hamble-le-Rice in the south. There were originally eight Red Rocket routes, lettered to avoid confusion with the Bluestar and Solent Blue Line service in operation at the time. Red Rocket services were either withdrawn or re-branded to Baby Bluestar on 24 February 2008, to enable Solent Blue Line to trade under the Bluestar name.

Solent Shuttle

The Solent Shuttle was an express bus link that ran between Portsmouth and Southampton. The service itself was established in 1976 as a joint venture between Hants & Dorset and Southdown Motor Services, between passing on to other operators including Southampton City Bus, First Hampshire & Dorset and Tellings-Golden Miller; First branded the services as the 727 and the 747 while Tellings-Golden Miller branded it the Solent Clipper, under the service names the X27 and the X47.

Solent Blue Line took over the service, but ran into difficulties following the cessation of funding from Portsmouth and Southampton City Councils. The service was due to close on 2 June 2007, but by popular demand and with the support of pensioners associations in both cities, the service continued on a two-hourly basis. However, the service ceased two years later on 21 February 2009.

Beep! Bus

The Beep! Bus service operated between Eastleigh, Boyatt Wood, Velmore and Southampton between 8 October 2008 and February 2009. The service operated in direct competition with the rival Velvet B service operating on the same route and timetabled three minutes behind those of the Beep bus. Initially the service was registered with VOSA as a Wilts & Dorset route to begin on 15 September 2008, but this was later cancelled and replaced with an identical Bluestar registration. The service began a full week before its registration date to match the start date of Velvet's service, but was unable to take fares and so operated as a free service until their start date a week later. Normal fares were slightly lower than Velvet's on some journeys but local journeys were more expensive. Bluestar operations director Andrew Wickham said that the decision was "a business decision pure and simple", adding that they "are not scared of competition" but Velvet were "deliberately creaming off" some of their passengers. The rival Velvet service ended on 10 January 2009 because of low passenger numbers. Soon after, Bluestar announced their intention to withdraw Beep! Bus from February 2009, ironically one year after they withdrew the Red Rocket B service.

Do the Docks

The 'Do the Docks' tour was an open-top bus tour of Southampton docks, using open-top buses from the New Forest Tour and a debranded Wilts & Dorset Leyland Olympian. The service changed on 29 July 2007 as a result of low passenger numbers following poor weather during the 2007 summer season, with the service losing its "turn up and hop on" format and becoming a chartered service. The route saw a brief reprieve in April 2008, when the service ran for two days on 26 and 27 of that month, as part of the Caribbean festival in Southampton. As Solent Blue Line no longer had the open-top buses for the routes, a hired Southern Vectis open-top bus was used.

Incidents and investigation
In March 2007 whilst being used as a rail-replacement bus a double-decker member of the Red Rocket fleet drove under a low bridge at Barnham causing the top to be ripped off, in addition to minor damage to the bridge. It is now with Southern Vectis as an open-topper. A similar incident occurred at Romsey in May 2015, when a double-decker bus had its roof removed after colliding with a railway bridge

In July 2009, the MP for Eastleigh Chris Huhne asked for an investigation into allegations of anti-competitive behaviour of Bluestar against Velvet's over their implementation and subsequent removal of extra services, which operated between Eastleigh and Fair Oak, to rival Velvet's service, the Fair Oak Flyer.

In the early hours of 22 March 2011, a car drove into the front right of a Bluestar bus on route 2 between Southampton and Fair Oak, resulting in a single fatality of the car driver, and injuries to the car passenger, the bus driver was treated for shock. Only one passenger of the 10 on board the bus were treated for minor injuries.

At around 16:30 on 7 February 2012, a Marchwood Motorways Mercedes-Benz Citaro caught fire on Calmore Roundabout, Totton. The bus was being driven Not In Service by a mechanic at the time - there were no injuries but the bus was destroyed. A similar incident occurred on 9 October 2020 at around 17:30 with an East Lancs Omnidekka bodied Scania N94UD on the M27, heading towards Fareham. The smoke from the fire could be seen from as far as the Isle of Wight.

On 3 April 2012, two buses on service 18 collided at the junction of Little Lances Hill and Peartree Avenue in Bitterne. The leading bus had to brake sharply to avoid another vehicle and the second bus ran into the back of it. Three passengers were slightly injured.

See also
List of bus operators of the United Kingdom

References

External links 

 

Bus operators in Hampshire
Companies based in Hampshire
Coach operators in England
Go South Coast companies
Transport in Hampshire